Ventsislav Velinov (born 2 January 1981) is a Bulgarian footballer.
Velinov previously played for Vihren Sandanski and Marek Dupnitsa in the A PFG. He is the son of legendary CSKA Sofia goalkeeper Georgi Velinov.

Awards
 CSKA Sofia
 Bulgarian Supercup: 2008

References

1981 births
Living people
Bulgarian footballers
Bulgarian expatriate footballers
First Professional Football League (Bulgaria) players
Cypriot First Division players
Association football goalkeepers
PFC CSKA Sofia players
Apollon Limassol FC players
PFC Marek Dupnitsa players
OFC Vihren Sandanski players
Botev Plovdiv players
PFC Nesebar players
Expatriate footballers in Cyprus